Nightstar may refer to:
 Nightstar (comics), DC Comics superhero
 Nightstar (train), Eurostar's abandoned sleeper service
 Nightstar Therapeutics, a pharmaceutical company acquired by Biogen

See also
Morning Star (disambiguation)